Fairpoint is a ghost town in Cherry Grove Township, Goodhue County, in the U.S. state of Minnesota.

History
Fairpoint was platted as a small village in 1857. A post office was established at Fairpoint from 1857 to 1861, and was reestablished in 1865 and remained in operation until it was discontinued in 1902. The Fairpoint cemetery remains today.

References

Ghost towns in Minnesota